Robert Guy (born February 21, 1964 on Trinidad) is a retired athlete from Trinidad and Tobago who specialized in the 400 metres. He attended Abilene Christian College, Texas, USA.

Achievements

External links
 
Best of Trinidad

1964 births
Living people
Abilene Christian University alumni
Trinidad and Tobago male sprinters
Athletes (track and field) at the 1995 Pan American Games
Athletes (track and field) at the 1996 Summer Olympics
Olympic athletes of Trinidad and Tobago
Pan American Games medalists in athletics (track and field)
Pan American Games bronze medalists for Trinidad and Tobago
Medalists at the 1995 Pan American Games